Auberg is a municipality in the district of Rohrbach in the Austrian state of Upper Austria.

Geography
Auberg lies in the Mühlviertel. About 26 percent of the municipality is forest, and 69 percent is farmland.

References

Cities and towns in Rohrbach District